National Bison Day is an annual celebration of the significance of the American bison. A campaign is underway to pass federal legislation officially recognizing National Bison Day. Although the legislation has so far failed to pass, the Senate has passed a resolution each year since 2013 recognizing the day.

The day is celebrated at sites involved in the conservation of American bison. In addition to organizing, sponsoring and attending local bison-related events and celebrations, the Beards for Bison campaign encouraged supporters to discuss National Bison Day on social media via hashtags and selfies.

Legislation
For several years, bison supporters have continued a "Vote Bison" campaign seeking to make the American bison the "National Mammal of the United States" and have National Bison Day officially designated as the first Saturday in November each year. The Senate has shown its approval by passing a resolution about the day each year, in recent years led by Senators Mike Enzi (R-WY) and Joe Donnelly (D-IN) and co-sponsored by a bipartisan group of senators. On May 9, 2016, President Obama signed the National Bison Legacy Act into law, officially making the American bison the national mammal of the United States.

References

Bison
Environmental awareness days
November observances
Saturday observances